Nonsuch Palace  was a Tudor royal palace, commissioned by Henry VIII in Surrey, England and completed in 1538. Its site lies in what is now Nonsuch Park on the boundaries of the borough of Epsom and Ewell in Surrey and the London Borough of Sutton.

The palace was designed to be a celebration of the power and the grandeur of the Tudor dynasty, built to rival Francis I's Château de Chambord. Unlike most of Henry's palaces, Nonsuch was not an adaptation of an old building; he chose to build a new palace in this location because it was near to one of his main hunting grounds. However the choice of location was unwise, as there was no nearby supply of water suitable for domestic use. The palace remained standing until 1682–3, when it was pulled down by Barbara, Countess of Castlemaine, mistress to Charles II, to sell off building materials to pay for her gambling debts.

Building
Nonsuch Palace, near Cheam, Greater London , was perhaps the grandest of Henry VIII's building projects. It was built on the site of Cuddington, near Ewell, the church and village having been destroyed and compensation paid, to create a suitable site. Work started on 22 April 1538, the first day of Henry's thirtieth regnal year, and six months after the birth of his son, later Edward VI.

Within two months the name "Nonsuch" appears in the building accounts, its name a boast that there was no such palace elsewhere equal to it in magnificence. Construction had been substantially carried out by 1541, but it took several more years to complete. As the Royal Household took possession of vast tracts of surrounding acreage, several major roads were re-routed or by-passed to circumvent what became Nonsuch Great Park.

Later history 
The palace was incomplete when Henry VIII died in 1547. In 1556 Queen Mary I sold it to Henry FitzAlan, 19th Earl of Arundel, who completed it. In 1585 the Treaty of Nonsuch was signed by Elizabeth I of England and the Dutch Republic at the palace. It returned to royal hands in the 1590s. Nonsuch came to Anne of Denmark as her jointure property as the consort of King James. The Great Park remained the property of Lord Lumley until he surrendered the lease to the queen in 1605. She rarely visited, but came in July 1617 attended by Viscount Lisle, Lucy, Countess of Bedford, and the Earls of Southampton and Montgomery.

Under King James I, Viscount Lumley was appointed Keeper of the Palace and Little Park, and then in 1606, the Earl of Worcester succeeded him, naming the park lodge Worcester House. Both James I and Charles I regularly visited for hunting and racing. 

Following Parliament's victory in the English Civil War, the Nonsuch estate was confiscated and let to a series of Parliamentarian supporters: first to Algernon Sidney, then to Colonel Robert Lilburne. The estate was then sold to Major-General John Lambert, and latterly to General Thomas Pride, who held it until his death in 1658. 

The palace was handed back to the Crown after the Restoration in 1660, with the palace given to Queen Henrietta Maria and the park and Worcester House leased to Sir Robert Long. John Evelyn visited it in 1666 and reported:I ... took an exact view of the plaster statues and bass-relievos inserted betwixt the timbers and punchceons of the outside walls of the Court; which must needs have been the work of some celebrated Italian. I much admired how they had lasted so well and entire since the time of Henry VIII., exposed as they are to the air; and pity it is they are not taken out and preserved in some dry place; a gallery would become them. There are some mezzo-relievos as big as the life; the story is of the Heathen Gods, emblems, compartments, &c. The palace consists of two courts, of which the first is of stone, castle like, by the Lord Lumleys (of whom it was purchased), the other of timber, a Gothic fabric, but these walls incomparably beautified. I observed that the appearing timber-puncheons, entrelices, &c., were all so covered with scales of slate, that it seemed carved in the wood and painted, the slate fastened on the timber in pretty figures, that has, like a coat of armour, preserved it from rotting. There stand in the garden two handsome stone pyramids, and the avenue planted with rows of fair elms, but the rest of these goodly trees, both of this and of Worcester Park adjoining, were felled by those destructive and avaricious rebels in the late war, which defaced one of the stateliest seats his Majesty had.

Nonsuch remained royal property until 1670, when Charles II gave it to his mistress, Barbara, Countess of Castlemaine, with the title Baroness of Nonsuch. She had it pulled down around 1682–3 and sold off the building materials to pay gambling debts.

Some elements were incorporated into other buildings; for example the wood panelling can still be seen today in the Great Hall at Loseley Park near Guildford. No trace of the palace remains on its site today, but some pieces are held by the British Museum. There is a discernible rise of land where the old Cuddington church used to be, before it was demolished to make way for the palace. Nonsuch Palace should not be confused with Nonsuch Mansion, which is at the east of the park, nor its associated banqueting hall whose foundations are still visible to the south east of the palace site.

The palace cost at least £24,000 (over £10 million in 2021) because of its rich ornamentation and is considered a key work in the introduction of elements of Renaissance design to England.

Archaeology 
Only about three contemporary images of the palace survive, and they do not reveal very much about either the layout or the details of the building. Following the digging of the trenches in World War II, it was reported that pieces of pottery had been discovered in the area, later found to be from the site of the palace. An outline of the site layout was also visible from the air, providing additional evidence in the search for the location of the site.

The site was excavated in 1959–60; the plan of the palace was quite simple with inner and outer courtyards, each with a fortified gatehouse. The exterior and outer courtyard were quite plain, but the inner courtyard was decorated with breathtaking stucco panels moulded in high relief. To the north, it was fortified in a medieval style, but the southern face had ornate Renaissance decoration, with tall octagonal towers at each end. It was within one of these towers that the premiere of Thomas Tallis' masterwork, Spem in alium, was perhaps performed. The 1959 excavation of Nonsuch by Martin Biddle, aged 22, was a key event in the history of archaeology in the UK. It was one of the first post-medieval sites to be excavated, and attracted over 75,000 visitors during the work. This excavation led to major developments in post-medieval archaeology.

Gardens 

John Speed's map of Surrey has an insert depicting the palace and a part of its gardens, including some of the principal ornaments. These are also known from detailed drawings in the "Red Velvet Book", the 1590 Lumley inventory.

See also
Artists of the Tudor court
Nonsuch (disambiguation)
 Nonsuch House on Old London Bridge
Loseley Park

Notes

Further reading

External links

A historical record of Nonsuch Palace
An account of the excavation of Nonsuch Palace

Palaces in England
Country houses in Surrey
Tudor royal palaces in England
Royal residences in England
Houses completed in 1538
Former palaces in England
Demolished buildings and structures in England
Epsom and Ewell
Mannerist architecture
Renaissance architecture in England
1538 establishments in England
Buildings and structures demolished in the 17th century
Anne of Denmark
Henrietta Maria